Dinamo Riga is a professional ice hockey team based in Riga, Latvia. It is a member of the Latvian Hockey Higher League. The club is affiliated with HK Zemgale/LLU.

The club was re-founded on 7 April 2008 as a successor of a former hockey team (also named "Dinamo Riga"), which was founded in 1946, but ceased to exist in 1995. Since being re-established, Dinamo Riga played their home games at the Arēna Rīga till 2022, which could accommodate attendance of 10,300 spectators.

History
The club was re-founded on 7 April 2008 and among the founders of the club were Guntis Ulmanis, Kirovs Lipmans, Mały Snopp , Juris Savickis, Viesturs Koziols and others. However, on 27 May, Latvian Ice Hockey Federation president Kirovs Lipmans stepped out of the project because of a possible clash of interests. After the first season, Viesturs Koziols also left the project.

Július Šupler became the first head coach of the club. For the first two seasons, he was assisted by Miroslav Miklošovič and Artis Ābols, but in 2010, Viktors Ignatjevs replaced Miklošovič. On 27 April 2011, the new head coach, Pekka Rautakallio, was announced.

In the first season of the franchise, the team was led by players like Masaļskis, Prusek, Westcott, Ņiživijs, Hossa and others. After 2008-09, forward Aigars Cipruss decided to retire and instantly became the manager of Dinamo Riga's farm club, Dinamo-Juniors Riga. The team finished the regular season in tenth position, higher than anyone would have predicted before the start of the season. However, in the first round of the league playoffs, Dinamo lost to Dynamo Moscow 0–3, which later advanced to the Gagarin Cup semifinals.

Following the first season, Dinamo managed to sign legendary Sandis Ozoliņš, as well as Jānis Sprukts, Mārtiņš Karsums and others. The team finished the regular season in eighth place of the Western Conference, which qualified them for the playoffs. In the first round of the playoffs, Dinamo faced SKA Saint Petersburg with players like Sergei Zubov, Petr Čajánek, Maxim Sushinsky and Alexei Yashin on the roster. Still, Dinamo managed to beat SKA 3–1 and advance to the Western Conference semifinals. In the semifinals, Dinamo was defeated by later Gagarin Cup finalist HC MVD, 1–4.

After his league-leading performance, Marcel Hossa signed a two-year contract with the then-current KHL champions Ak Bars Kazan. Martin Kariya signed a two-year contract with Swiss NLA's HC Ambrì-Piotta. New players signed during the off-season include Tomáš Surový, Brock Trotter, Mikael Tellqvist and the returning Mark Hartigan. Július Šupler resumed his post as the head coach.

The team finished the season in seventh place in the Western Conference and thirteenth in the league, as the team qualified to the playoffs. In the first round, their opponents were Dynamo Moscow. Dinamo won the series 4–2, advancing to the next round and facing Lokomotiv Yaroslavl. Dinamo lost the series 1–4.

As of the end of the third season, head coach Július Šupler left the team to be the coach of CSKA Moscow. On April 27, 2011, Dinamo signed Pekka Rautakallio for the head coach position. Also, all the foreign players with no active contracts left the team to play somewhere else. Brock Trotter also left using his chance to play in the NHL with the Montreal Canadiens.

On February 27, 2022, Dinamo withdrew from KHL in protest against the Russian invasion of Ukraine.

On August 10, 2022, it was announced that Dinamo Riga will play in the Latvian Hockey Higher League next season.

Crest

Season-by-season record
This is a partial list of the last ten seasons completed by Dinamo Riga. For the full season-by-season history, see List of Dinamo Riga seasons.

Note: GP = Games played, W = Wins, L = Losses, OTW = Overtime/shootout wins, OTL = Overtime/shootout losses, Pts = Points, GF = Goals for, GA = Goals against

Players

Current roster

Retired numbers

Team captains

 Rodrigo Laviņš, 2008–2009
 Sandis Ozoliņš, 2009–2012
 Mārtiņš Karsums, 2012–2013
 Sandis Ozoliņš, 2013–2014
 Lauris Dārziņš, 2014–2016
 Gints Meija 2016–2017
 Miks Indrašis 2017–2018
 Lauris Dārziņš, 2018–2022
 Georgijs Pujacs, 2022–2023
 Miķelis Rēdlihs, 2023–present

Head coaches

Július Šupler, 22 May 2008 – 29 March 2011
Pekka Rautakallio, 27 April 2011 – 5 November 2012
Artis Ābols, 5 November 2012 – 30 April 2015
Kari Heikkilä, July 2015 – 7 January 2016 
Normunds Sējējs, 7 January 2016 – 29 May 2017
Sandis Ozoliņš, 29 May 2017 – 28 September 2017
Ģirts Ankipāns, 28 September 2017 – 3 March 2020
Pēteris Skudra, 20 July 2020 – 3 March 2021
Sergei Zubov, 12 April 2021 – 21 October 2021
, 22 October 2021 – 29 November 2021
Vladimir Krikunov, 29 November 2021 – 30 April 2022
Leonīds Beresņevs, 17 August 2022 – present

Franchise records and leaders

Scoring leaders

Leading goaltenders

References

External links

 

 
Ice hockey teams in Riga
Ice hockey clubs established in 2008
2008 establishments in Latvia
Former Kontinental Hockey League teams